Cyrtodesmidae is a family of millipedes. Shear (2011) recognised the group as containing 30 species in 3 genera, probably Agnurodesmus Silvestri, 1910, Cyrtodesmus Gervais in Walckenaer, 1847, and Oncodesmella Kraus, 1959, although other authors recognise different components.

See also
Cyrtodesmus depressus
Cyrtodesmus humerosus
Cyrtodesmus lobatus

References

Polydesmida
Millipede families